Leinster League Division One, as the name implies, is the first division of the Leinster League and started in the 1994/95 season.

Suttonians, Co. Carlow, Arklow, Mullingar, Garda, Navan, Naas, Wexford Wanderers, Portlaoise, Dundalk and Enniscorthy entered the division through the qualifying matches in the 1993/1994 season.

The number of teams in the division was reduced from 14 to 12 in the 2007/08 season, but this was reversed in the 2008/09 season.

2008/2009 Season 
 Boyne
 Cill Dara
 Dundalk
 Enniscorthy
 Garda
 Monkstown
 Navan
 Newbridge
 Portlaoise
 Seapoint
 Skerries
 Tullamore
 Tullow
 Wicklow

2008/2009 Table

2007/2008 Season 
 Ashbourne
 Boyne
 Cill Dara
 Dundalk
 Garda
 Monkstown
 Navan
 Portlaoise
 Seapoint
 Skerries
 Tullamore
 Wicklow

At the end of the season, Ashbourne were relegated to Division Two and Enniscorthy, Newbridge and Tullow were promoted, making it 14 teams once again for 2008/2009.

2007/2008 Table

2006/2007 Season 
 Boyne
 Cill Dara
 Dundalk
 Enniscorthy
 Garda
 Kilkenny
 Monkstown
 Mullingar
 Naas
 Navan
 Portlaoise
 Seapoint
 Skerries
 Tullamore

At the end of the season, Mullingar, Enniscorthy and Kilkenny were relegated to Division Two and Ashbourne and Wicklow were promoted. Naas won promotion to AIB Division Three.

2006/2007 Table

Past winners 

1994/1995 Dundalk
1995/1996 Suttonians
1996/1997 Co Carlow
1997/1998 Naas
1998/1999 Barnhall
1999/2000 Naas
2000/2001 Navan
2001/2002 Kilkenny
2002/2003 Kilkenny
2003/2004 Seapoint RFC
2004/2005 Naas
2005/2006 Monkstown
2006/2007 Naas
2007/2008 Cill Dara
2008/2009 Navan
2009/2010 Seapoint RFC

Wins by club

 Naas (4 times)
 Kilkenny (twice)
 Navan (Twice)
 Seapoint RFC (Twice)
 Barnhall (once)
 Cill Dara (once)
 Co Carlow (once)
 Dundalk (once)
 Monkstown (once)
 Suttonians (once)

External links
Leinster Rugby : Leinster League History: Division One
Leinster League Division One 2008/2009
Leinster League Division One 2007/2008
Leinster League Division One 2006/2007

Leinster League